Osman Aden Abdulle is a prominent Somali physician and geneticist.

Biography
Osman is the son of Somalia's first president Aden Abdulle Osman Daar. He is the director of the Blood Transfusion Service in Mogadishu, and is the World Health Organization's representative in Somalia. In 1987, he and his colleagues jointly discovered a new Rh gene complex producing the rare Cx (Rh9) antigen in the Somali population .

Work
Haemophilia in Somalia (1989)
Distribution of blood groups in the East African Somali population (1987)

References

Somalian scientists
Living people
Year of birth missing (living people)